Processional Arts Workshop (PAW) is an ensemble of performing artists and theatrical technicians founded in 1998, devoted to pageant puppetry and processional art. They are also known by the name Superior Concept Monsters (SCM). They are best known for creating the large-scale puppet performances that lead New York's Village Halloween Parade.

History
Founded by NY Halloween Parade designers Alex Kahn and Sophia Michahelles in 1998, SCM creates large-scale site-specific performance works specifically for the medium of procession, involving giant puppets, mobile scenography, shadow and projection, and other visual elements. These works often involve hundreds of volunteers who build and rehearse in community workshops, and then perform in the final event. Beyond their work for the Halloween Parade, PAW has travelled to communities around the world to create site-specific processions and parades based on local themes. Drawing on regional cultures, oral history, and current sociopolitical concerns, the group encourages local residents to participate at every stage of production from initial design to final performance. thus empowering them to identify and preserve narratives that uniquely define “local” in their own community. To date they have created events in Italy, Trinidad, Maine, Texas, New York, and other locales. Other recent PAW works have included major commissions for Socrates Sculpture Park the NY Architectural League's Beaux Arts Ball, the PEN World Voices Festival, Houston's Buffalo Bayou Park, the Grand Opening of the High Line over Penn Rail Yards.

In 2001, PAW's work achieved widespread attention when Michahelles designed a giant silk  puppet of the Phoenix – the mythical bird that rises from its own ashes – for the NY Halloween Parade, as a hopeful tribute to  New York's resilience after 9/11. The puppet was built and performed by witnesses to the terrorist attacks on the World Trade Center, and garnered national and international media attention.

PAW has received numerous awards and grants and residencies, including a CEC Artslink Grant for work in Kyiv Ukraine, a Mid-Atlantic Arts Foundation Artist in Communities Grant (2006), a Roman J Witt Visiting Artist Fellowship at University of Michigan in Ann Arbor, and an Artist Residency at Caribbean Contemporary Art in Port of Spain, Trinidad and Tobago. In addition, PAW co-founder Alex Kahn was awarded a Fulbright Fellowship to study the traditions and social structures of the Trinidad Carnival.

See also
New York's Village Halloween Parade
Alex Kahn
Sophia Michahelles

Notes

References

Johnson, Gabe. "Pulling Big Brother's Strings Instead", New York Times (May 12, 2014)
Ryzik, Melena. "Odysseus Is Parading Into Queens", New York Times (August 26, 2011)
Tancons, Claire."The Greatest Free Show on Earth: Carnival from Trinidad to Brazil, Cape Town to New Orleans." in Prospect.1 New Orleans Catalogue (PictureBox, 2008)  
Duprey, Rolande. "Greenwich Village Halloween Parade" Puppetry International Fall/Winter 2007- Issue No. 22
James, Kayode. "Puppeteers Find That Cultural Link", Trinidad Guardian (April 25, 2006) 
Botti, Deborah. "It Takes a Community to Build a Puppet" Middletown Times Herald-Record (February 23, 2003)  
Honig, Elenor J. “Community Puppeteer” Harvard Magazine (January/February 2003)  
Michahelles, Sophia. ”The Mysterious Life of Giant Puppets” Teokikixtli - Mexican Review of Puppet Arts (July 2001)   
Dewan, Sheila.  "Night of the Living Dot-Com”. New York Times (November 1, 2000)
Aschan, Jan   "Halloween årets rysare"  NyTeknik (November 2000) – Swedish technical journal – feature article on Halloween puppetry works
New York Times (November 1, 1998) – p. B1, photo from Superior Concept Monsters performance work in Halloween Parade

External links
Processional Arts Workshop, Inc.
New York Times feature on PAW performance for 2014 PEN World Voices Festival
National Public Radio/WNYC feature story on Superior Concept Monsters puppet-making workshop

Performance artist collectives
Puppet troupes
Puppetry in the United States